The Phoenix Prospectors were a professional baseball team  in the United States. The team was based in Phoenix, Arizona and a member of the independent Freedom Pro Baseball League, which was not affiliated with Minor League Baseball. They played their home games at Phoenix Municipal Stadium in 2013. They were founded in 2012 as the Copper State Prospectors and played their games at Peoria Sports Complex in Peoria, Arizona before moving to Phoenix for 2013.

They won both of the Freedom League championships in 2012 and 2013.

2013 roster

References

 Official site
 Phoenix Prospectors

Freedom Pro Baseball League teams
Baseball teams established in 2013
Professional baseball teams in Arizona
2012 establishments in Arizona
2013 disestablishments in Arizona
Baseball teams disestablished in 2013
Sports in Phoenix, Arizona
Sports in Peoria, Arizona
Defunct independent baseball league teams
Defunct baseball teams in Arizona